Beruwala Harbour, in Beruwala, Sri Lanka, is one of the main fishery harbours on the western coast of Sri Lanka. It is situated in the southern edge of the Kalutara district, which is about 60 km south of Colombo. It has the capability of supplying berthing, refrigeration and fuel facilities which are often needed by fishing boats.

The fishery harbour was destroyed during the 2004 Asian Tsunami and reconstructed by CFHC Awakening of Fishery Harbour project. 

Economy of Kalutara District
Ports and harbours of Sri Lanka
Transport in Kalutara District